The Midnight Gang is a children's book written by David Walliams and illustrated by Tony Ross. It was released by HarperCollins on November 3, 2016. The story follows a boy called Thomas going to the hospital — the Lord Funt hospital.

Reception 
Emily Bearn wrote in The Daily Telegraph, "it is a simple and touching story of children overcoming adversity with make-believe". Common Sense Media's Mary Eisenhart said, "British author David Walliams is in top form with this imaginative, poignant, often crude, and frequently hilarious tale of kids stuck in a London hospital. ... it's a heartstring-tugging, thought-provoking tale with unforgettable characters, relatable issues, and a determination to do better than the bad people in your life."

In a positive review for the School Library Journal, Caitlin Augusta stated, "Ross's numerous black-and-white illustrations mirror Walliams's lawless, uncontained revelry. ... Irreverent as Roald Dahl, Walliams is a unique author who's created a memorable world and cast of characters." In a mixed review, Kirkus Reviews said, "An entertaining tale that will definitely find an audience, but fans of icky, vicious comedy deserve better."

Adaptations 
The book was adapted for the theatre.

References 

2015 British novels
British children's novels
British novels adapted into films
HarperCollins books
Novels by David Walliams
Fiction set in 1983